Druid (Welsh: Y Ddwyryd) is a small village in Denbighshire, Wales. The village is located where the A5 and the A494 meet, about two miles west of Corwen and near the boundary with Gwynedd.

The name is an anglicised corruption of the Welsh name Y Ddwyryd (lit. 'the Two Fords') from its position nearby two fords, one on the River Ceirw, which runs into the River Dee lower down the valley, and the other on a small stream flowing into that river. It has no connection to Druidic history or folk lore.

Villages in Denbighshire
Corwen